Eric Joseph Winston (born November 17, 1983) is a former American football offensive tackle. He played in college at the University of Miami and was drafted by the Houston Texans in the third round of the 2006 NFL Draft. Winston has also played for the Kansas City Chiefs, Arizona Cardinals, and Cincinnati Bengals. He was the president of the National Football League Players Association (NFLPA) from 2014 to 2020.

Early years
Winston played high school football at Robert E. Lee High School in Midland, Texas, where he was ranked amongst the most talented high school tight ends in the country. He played alongside fellow NFL running back Cedric Benson, and the two helped win three Texas 5A state championships.

College career
Winston chose to attend college at the University of Miami after being heavily recruited by several other schools. At Miami, Winston majored in International Finance and Marketing and played offensive tackle. He initially was set to play tight end for the Hurricanes, but made the switch before his sophomore year. Winston was widely considered one of the best offensive tackles to enter the 2006 NFL Draft. However, an anterior cruciate ligament injury during his junior year made his draft stock drop, and several draft scouting organizations expressed slight worry over the possible implications of the injury and subsequent surgery on his play.

Winston was also a standout student, graduating in three years with a GPA above 3.5, and he was a 2005 All-America selection. He was a member of the Pi Kappa Alpha Fraternity.

Professional career

Houston Texans
Winston was drafted in the 3rd round of the 2006 NFL Draft.  He started the final seven games as a rookie at right tackle in 2006 and proceeded to start 87 games for them until 2011.  He signed a contract extension prior to the 2008 season. The Texans released him on March 12, 2012.

Kansas City Chiefs
Winston signed with the Kansas City Chiefs on March 17, 2012. On October 7, 2012, Winston spoke out about Kansas City Chiefs fans, who he thought were cheering an injury to quarterback Matt Cassel. No video evidence has ever been produced to support Winston's claim.  In a post game interview, he claimed "this isn't the Roman Colosseum" and "it is hard economic times". He mentioned that he came to the understanding he probably won't live as long because he plays this game, but cheering over a player getting knocked out is "100% sickening". He was released by the Chiefs on March 6, 2013.

Arizona Cardinals

Winston signed a one-year contract with the Arizona Cardinals on July 25, 2013.

Seattle Seahawks
Winston signed a one-year contract with the Seattle Seahawks on July 29, 2014. Winston failed to make the final 53-man roster, and was released on August 30, 2014.

Cincinnati Bengals
Winston signed a one-year contract with the Cincinnati Bengals on December 2, 2014.

On March 9, 2016, the Bengals re-signed Winston to a one-year, $1.09 million contract.

On March 10, 2017, the Bengals re-signed Winston to his third consecutive one-year contract. He was released on September 2, 2017. He was re-signed by the Bengals on November 8, 2017 after Jake Fisher went down with an illness.

NFL Players Association
In March 2014, Winston was elected president of the National Football League Players Association (NFLPA), succeeding Domonique Foxworth. Prior to being elected president, Winston had been involved with the NFLPA in other capacities, including being elected as a co-alternate NFLPA representative for the Houston Texans in 2010 and serving on committees for agent discipline and finance. He was also vocal during the 2011 NFL lockout. Winston has stated that his first priorities for his presidency will be player health and safety, financial literacy, and workplace conditions, especially in the locker room. He was succeeded by J. C. Tretter in March 2020.

Personal life
Winston is married, and has two daughters and one son. He also does volunteer work for the Shriners Hospitals for Children.

References

External links

Miami Hurricanes football bio
Houston Texans bio
Seattle Seahawks bio

1983 births
Living people
People from Midland, Texas
Robert E. Lee High School (Midland, Texas) alumni
Players of American football from Texas
American football offensive tackles
Miami Hurricanes football players
Houston Texans players
Kansas City Chiefs players
Arizona Cardinals players
Seattle Seahawks players
Cincinnati Bengals players
Presidents of the National Football League Players Association
Trade unionists from Texas